The name Beti has been used for two tropical cyclones worldwide, both in the South Pacific Ocean:

 Cyclone Beti (1984) – crossed over from the Australian region and struck the Loyalty Islands.
 Cyclone Beti (1995) – affected Australia, New Caledonia, New Zealand and Vanuatu, killing 2 people.

South Pacific cyclone set index articles